The  Asian Baseball Championship was the sixteenth continental tournament held by the Baseball Federation of Asia. The tournament was held in Beijing, China for the first time. The tournament was won by the defending champions Japan; their tenth Asian Championship.

China became the sixth nation to host the tournament in its history, finishing 6th. Chinese Taipei (2nd), South Korea (3rd), Australia (4th), Philippines (5th) and Guam (7th) were the other participants.

References

Bibliography 
 

1991
1991
Asian Baseball Championship
1991 in Chinese sport
Baseball in Beijing